California's 38th district may refer to:

 California's 38th congressional district
 California's 38th State Assembly district
 California's 38th State Senate district